Penthicodes atomaria is a species of lanternfly belonging to the family Fulgoridae.

Description
The pronotum is yellow, the head and the scutellum are brown, while the abdomen is reddish with a few small white spots. The upper side of the forewings is whitish at the base and brown at the marginal, with four black spots. The upper side of the hindwings is red, with many black spots and two large black marking at the apex.

Distribution
This species can be found in Indonesia, Thailand, Laos and Vietnam.

References

Insects of Indonesia
Insects of Laos
Aphaeninae